The University of Sydney Susan Wakil School of Nursing and Midwifery, also known as Sydney Nursing School is the nursing school of the University of Sydney in Australia. It was founded in 1991 initially as The University of Sydney Faculty of Nursing. On 30 April 2018 it joined the newly combined Faculty of Medicine and Health.

Sydney Nursing School has been ranked number two in Australia and 15th in the world in the 2018 QS Subject rankings.

Coursework programs

Undergraduate
Sydney Nursing School offer three entry-to-practice pathways to becoming a registered nurse in Australia:
 Bachelor of Nursing (Advanced Studies)
 Combined bachelor's degree–Master of Nursing with:
Bachelor of Arts
Bachelor of Health Science
Bachelor of Science
 Master of Nursing (Graduate Entry)

Postgraduate
Master’s, Graduate Diploma and Graduate Certificate level options are available in the following areas of clinical practice:
 Advanced Nursing Practice
 Cancer and Haematology Nursing
 Clinical Trials Practice (Graduate Certificate only)
 Emergency Nursing
 Intensive Care Nursing
 Mental Health Nursing
 Nurse Practitioner
 Primary Health Care Nursing

Research activity
The School has six core research themes:
 Midwifery and Women's Health
 Cancer and Palliative Care
 Chronic Disease and Ageing
 Acute, Critical and Trauma Care
 Mental Health
 Health Care Practice

References

External links
Sydney Nursing School

Nursing
Nursing schools in Australia
1991 establishments in Australia